Gearhart is a city in Clatsop County, Oregon, United States. The population was 1,462 at the 2010 census.

Geography 

History 
The city is named for Phillip Gearhart, a settler who in 1848 set out from Independence, Missouri, with his family and arrived in Oregon City in October of that year. He rented a log cabin on Clatsop Plains. At that time, other farmers had already settled primarily on the northern Plains. The first farmer to settle there was Solomon Smith. In 1851, Gearhart bought a squatter's right in the south Plains for $1,000. He used it to create a  donation land claim; the US patent was granted in 1874. The entire parcel encompassed all of what is now called Gearhart, as well as a portion of Seaside across the Necanicum River estuary. Gearhart built a home and farm for his family near a grist mill by Mill Creek, in a sheltered area north and east of the estuary.

In 1889, a railroad was built between Astoria and Seaside.  It became a means of transportation to Seaside not only for Astorians but for Portlanders disembarking from the ferry in Astoria.  Gearhart began to draw attention as a pleasant landscape for wandering and picnicking. Early settlers were attracted to the Ridge Path through the dune meadows of the Phillip Gearhart land claim.

Demographics

2010 census
As of the census of 2010, there were 1,462 people, 649 households, and 429 families residing in the city. The racial makeup of the city was 94.6% White, 0.3% African American, 0.4% Native American, 0.8% Asian, 0.2% Pacific Islander, 1.7% from other races, and 2.0% from two or more races. Hispanic or Latino of any race were 4.0% of the population.

There were 649 households, of which 22.3% had children under the age of 18 living with them, 54.2% were married couples living together, 8.3% had a female householder with no husband present, 3.5% had a male householder with no wife present, and 33.9% were non-families. 26.2% of all households were made up of individuals, and 10.7% had someone living alone who was 65 years of age or older. The average household size was 2.25 and the average family size was 2.69.

The median age in the city was 49 years. 17.4% of residents were under the age of 18; 6.2% were between the ages of 18 and 24; 20.3% were from 25 to 44; 37.8% were from 45 to 64; and 18.4% were 65 years of age or older. The gender makeup of the city was 48.9% male and 51.1% female.

2000 census

As of the census of 2000, there were 995 people, 450 households, and 282 families residing in the city. The population density was 804.2 people per square mile (309.8/km2). There were 1,055 housing units at an average density of 852.7 per square mile (328.5/km2). The racial makeup of the city was 98.39% White, 0.30% Native American, 0.30% Asian, and 1.01% from two or more races. Hispanic or Latino of any race were 0.50% of the population. 16.0% were German, 15.7% English, 10.2% Irish, 7.4% American, 5.7% Norwegian and 5.2% Swedish ancestry according to Census 2000.

There were 450 households, out of which 22.7% had children under the age of 18 living with them, 52.9% were married couples living together, 6.4% had a female householder with no husband present, and 37.3% were non-families. 32.4% of all households were made up of individuals, and 12.2% had someone living alone who was 65 years of age or older. The average household size was 2.21 and the average family size was 2.76.

In the city, the population was spread out, with 19.9% under the age of 18, 4.5% from 18 to 24, 21.3% from 25 to 44, 35.6% from 45 to 64, and 18.7% who were 65 years of age or older. The median age was 47 years. For every 100 females, there were 95.9 males. For every 100 females aged 18 and over, there were 93.4 males.

The median income for a household in the city was $43,047, and the median income for a family was $49,583. Males had a median income of $32,500 versus $23,636 for females. The per capita income for the city was $25,224. About 4.7% of families and 6.4% of the population were below the poverty line, including 4.8% of those under age 18 and 6.8% of those aged 65 or over.

Topography

The city lies on flat land along the coast.  The Oregon geology department determined the city lacks viable options for high ground, leaving it vulnerable to tsunamis.

References

External links 
 Entry for Gearhart in the Oregon Blue Book

Cities in Oregon
Cities in Clatsop County, Oregon
Populated coastal places in Oregon
Seaside resorts in Oregon
1918 establishments in Oregon
Astoria, Oregon micropolitan area
Populated places established in 1918